Mantas Armalis (born 6 September 1992) is a Lithuanian professional ice hockey goaltender for Leksands IF of the Swedish Hockey League (SHL). He previously played in various Swedish ice hockey leagues, American Hockey League (AHL) and Kontinental Hockey League (KHL).

Playing career
Armalis began his career with the Djurgårdens IF's under-16 squad during the 2007–08 season, but moved to the Mora IK organization where he played for their junior J18 and J20 teams from 2007 to 2011. He started the 2011–12 season continuing to play for Mora IK, and was temporarily loaned to Söderhamn/Ljusne, a Division 1 C club. He made his debut in Division 1 on 5 October 2011 against Lindlövens IF. Söderhamn/Ljusne lost 5–3, while Armalis made 30 saves on 35 shots playing 60 minutes. On 30 November 2011, he played one more game while on loan to Division 1C team Borlänge HF against Hudiksvalls HC. His team lost 6–5 in overtime as Armalis again made 30 saves on 35 shots. He started 2012–13 season on loan to Tranås AIF and after 18 games of the regular season he had a 6–5–1 record with the second best save percentage in the league among all goalkeepers (93.31%) with 2.09 GAA. His team's results steadily improved after starting season with four losses and they were fighting for a playoff spot, while Mantas went away to help the Lithuanian national team in Olympic qualifiers.

On 11 April 2016, it was announced that Armalis signed an entry-level contract with the San Jose Sharks. Prior to signing with the Sharks, the Toronto Maple Leafs were considered favourites to land Armalis. Armalis made his debut for the Sharks in a preseason game against the Vancouver Canucks where he saved six shots out of seven, while the Sharks won. On 3 October 2016, Armalis was assigned to the Sharks' American Hockey League (AHL) affiliate San Jose Barracuda. After the 2016–17 season, the Sharks decided not to issue a qualifying offer to Armalis and he would become an unrestricted free agent on 1 July 2017.

On 3 October 2017, Armalis signed with Dinamo Riga of the Kontinental Hockey League (KHL). As Dinamo's backup for the 2017–18 season, Armalis collected three wins in 12 appearances.

On 7 May 2018, Armalis returned to SHL and signed a two-year contract with Skellefteå AIK.

On 24 March 2020, Armalis returned to Djurgårdens IF of the SHL and signed a two-year contract. On 13 April 2022, he signed a three-year contract with Leksands IF of the SHL.

International play
Since 2008 he is junior member for Lithuania and played for his country at 2008, 2009 WJC18 D1, at 2010 WJC20 D1 and seniorside WJC D1 in 2010, as well as at 2012 WJC20 D1. He was named Best Goalkeeper of the tournament at 2012 IIHF Ice Hockey U20 World Championship Division II Group A in Ukraine.

Modeling
Armalis participated in several Versace runway shows during Milan Fashion Week. He worked with several agencies: Stockholmsgruppen, L.A Models, NYMM.

Armalis also modeled for Versace for their spring/summer collection in 2012 as well as the fall/winter collection in 2013. Making him an established face of the Versace label, Donatella Versace commented "Versace needs faces and bodies like Mantas, the strong gladiator-like build and muscular thighs,"

Personal life
Armalis's parents moved to Sweden when he was four months old. Both his parents were professional orienteers and moved due to popularity of the sport. He was encouraged to join the same sport as his parents, but picked up ice hockey instead.

Career statistics

Regular season and playoffs

Awards
 Best Goaltender – WJC18 D1 — 2008/2009
 Best Goaltender – WJC20 D2 Group A — 2012

References

External links
 

1992 births
Living people
Dinamo Riga players
Djurgårdens IF Hockey players
Leksands IF players
Lithuanian expatriate sportspeople in Sweden
Lithuanian ice hockey goaltenders
Lithuanian male models
Mora IK players
San Jose Barracuda players
Skellefteå AIK players
Sportspeople from Plungė